2MASS J09373487+2931409, or 2MASSI J0937347+293142 (abbreviated to 2MASS 0937+2931) is a brown dwarf of spectral class T6, located in the constellation Leo about 19.96 light-years from Earth.

Discovery
2MASS 0937+2931 was discovered in 2002 by Adam J. Burgasser et al. from Two Micron All-Sky Survey (2MASS), conducted from 1997 to 2001. Follow-up observations were made in 1998–2001 using the Near-Infrared Camera, mounted on the Palomar 60 inch (1.5 m) Telescope; CTIO Infrared Imager (CIRIM) and Ohio State Infrared Imager/Spectrometer (OSIRIS), mounted on the Cerro Tololo Inter-American Observatory (CTIO) 1.5 m Telescope; and some additional observations were made using the Near Infrared Camera (NIRC), mounted on the Keck I 10 m telescope, and nearinfrared camera D78, mounted on the Palomar 5 m Hale Telescope. In 2002 Burgasser et al. published a paper, where they defined new spectral subtypes T1—T8, and presented discovery of 11 new T-type brown dwarfs, among which also was 2MASS 0937+2931. This 11 objects were among the earliest T-type brown dwarfs ever discovered: before this, the total number of known T-type objects was 13, and this discoveries increased it up to 24 (apart from additional T-type dwarfs, identified by Geballe et al. 2001 in SDSS data).

Distance
Currently the most precise distance estimate of 2MASS 0937+2931 is trigonometric parallax, published in 2009 by Schilbach et al.: 163.39 ± 1.76 mas, corresponding to a distance 6.12 ± 0.07 pc, or 19.96 ± 0.22 ly. A less precise parallax of this object, measured under U.S. Naval Observatory Infrared Astrometry Program, was published in 2004 by Vrba et al.

Properties
2MASS 0937+2931 has an unusual spectrum, indicating a metal-poor atmosphere and/or a high surface gravity (high pressure at the surface).  Its effective temperature is estimated at about 800 Kelvin. The Research Consortium On Nearby Stars (RECONS) estimates the brown dwarf to be 0.03 solar masses. No optical variability was detected as in 2014.

See also
The other 10 brown dwarfs, presented in Burgasser et al. (2002):
2MASS 0243-2453 (T6)
2MASS 0415-0935 (T8)
2MASS 0727+1710 (T7)

References

External links
 Burgasser et al.: A Method for Determining the Physical Properties of the Coldest Known Brown Dwarfs"; in: The Astrophysical Journal, Vol. 639, Issue 2, S. 1095ff. (2006)
 Cushing et al.: A Spitzer Infrared Spectrograph Spectral Sequence of M, L, and T Dwarfs"; in: The Astrophysical Journal, Vol. 648, Issue 1, S. 614ff. (2006)

Leo (constellation)
Brown dwarfs
T-type stars
J09373487+2931409
Astronomical objects discovered in 2002